Scars is a 2002 album by the Gary Moore-led blues rock group called Scars (not to be confused with the Edinburgh post-punk group called Scars).

In 2002 Gary Moore decided to form a band with ex-Skunk Anansie bassist Cass Lewis and Primal Scream drummer Darrin Mooney called Scars. A spokesman for Sanctuary Records says: "Gary was blown away by the power and precision of Mooney's playing when he was auditioning drummers [...], and while looking for a bassist to complete the new line-up Darrin suggested that he take a look at Cass. When they all got together to play for the first time, it was perfect. Everything just clicked. It was so natural, so completely uncontrived that it was immediately obvious to Moore that this was going to be the ultimate line-up, and he was right.". This album and band title may allude to both Moore's emotional scars or the scars on his face he had contracted through a broken glass in a bar dispute in the late 1970s when he was protecting his girlfriend from harassment.

Their studio album "Scars", released on 2 September on Sanctuary Records, includes compositions  reminiscent of the sound of artists like Jimi Hendrix and Stevie Ray Vaughan, in a modern way.

Track listing

Personnel
Scars
 Gary Moore – vocals, guitars, production, mixing
 Cass Lewis – bass, backing vocals
 Darrin Mooney – drums

Technical personnel
Chris Tsangarides – producer, engineer, mixing
Tim Hole, Dan Turner, Drew Roberts, Matt Crawford – assistant engineers
Ian Cooper – mastering at Metropolis Mastering, London

References

2002 debut albums
Albums produced by Chris Tsangarides
Gary Moore albums
Sanctuary Records albums